The Women's Sailboard (Lechner A-390) Competition at the 1992 Summer Olympics was held from 27 July to 4 August 1992, in Barcelona, Spain. Points were awarded for placement in each race. Best nine out of ten scores did count for the final placement.

Results

Daily standings

Notes

References 
 
 
 
 
 

 

Lechner A-390 Women's
Lechner A-390
Oly
Sail